In some Brazilian states - especially in the North and Northeast regions - politics are still dominated by a particular group, commonly a wealthy, long-established family.

Brazilian Oligarchs often trace the origins of their power to the colonial, and although they have gradually lost political power since de re-democratization- specially after the 2006 elections, which represented a great defeat for some of the strongest groups, such as the Sarney family, from the State of Maranhão, and the Magalhães family, from the State of Bahia, both which were unable to elect their candidates in their respective states, and the Neves/Cunha, from the State of Minas Gerais, that 50 years, all governor elected, was defeated in 2014, by Pimentel.

Although oligarchs are now associated with Northeastern states and politicians, during the Old Republic times the politics were dominated by the wealthy coffee oligarchs from the states of São Paulo and Minas Gerais. The 1929 crisis, the Estado Novo and the urbanization and industrialization of the southeast eventually brought and end for their long-standing legacy. In the still rural and poverty-stricken Northeast, however, they still concentrate richness and power.

The Oligarch families are frequently associated with corruption, control of the local governments, support for the military dictatorship in the past, parallel power, and ownership of the local media and lands.

Current oligarch families
 Barbalho family, Pará State
 Calheiros family, Alagoas State
 Collor de Mello family, Alagoas State
 Jereissati family, Ceará State
 Sarney family, Maranhão and Amapá States
 Magalhães family, Bahia State
 Cals family, Ceará State
 Neves da Cunha family, Minas Gerais and Rio de Janeiro States
 Souto family, Bahia State
 Braide Family, Maranhão State

Past oligarch families

Notable oligarchy members
 Aécio Neves – former governor of Minas Gerais, senator for Minas Gerais, former federal deputy for Minas Gerais (1987–2002), son of Aécio Cunha (1927–2010)
 Jader Barbalho – former governor of Pará, former federal deputy for Pará,  senator for Pará,
 Renan Calheiros – former Minister of Justice, senator for Alagoas.
 Fernando Collor de Mello – former Brazilian president, former governor of Alagoas, senator for Alagoas.
 Tasso Jereissati – former governor of Ceará, senator for Ceará.
 José Sarney – former Brazilian president, former Governor of Maranhão, former senator for Maranhão, senator for Amapá.
 Roseana Sarney – former governor of Maranhão, daughter of José Sarney.
 Antônio Carlos Magalhães (1927–2007) – former governor of Bahia, former senator for Bahia.
 Francisco Dornelles – vice-governor, former nacional president of Progressive Party.
 Eduardo Braide – state deputy from Maranhão.

See also
Coronelismo

Oligarchs
Oligarchs